Lac du Fort-du-Plasne is a lake at Fort-du-Plasne in the Jura department of France.

Fort Du Plasne